Marco Biagi can refer to:
 Marco Biagi (jurist) (1950–2002), Italian jurist
 Marco Biagi (politician) (born 1982), Scottish SNP politician